The Osella PA2000 is a ground effect sports prototype race car, designed, developed and built by Italian manufacturer Osella, specifically for competing in hillclimb racing.

References 

Sports prototypes
Osella vehicles
Mid-engined cars